Great Bowden is a village and civil parish in the Harborough district of Leicestershire, England. It is north-east of and a suburb of Market Harborough, although originally the parish of Great Bowden included Harborough. The population is around 1,000, being measured at the 2011 census as 1,017.    Places nearby include Market Harborough, Little Bowden, Sutton Bassett, Foxton and Thorpe Langton.

Anglo-Saxon origins 
The village was included in the Domesday Book, under the name 'Bugedone' and was worth 40 shillings per year to the King. 'Bugedone', is a combination of the Old English female personal name 'Bucga' and the word 'dun' (meaning 'a hill, a flat-topped hill, an open upland expanse').  It is one of the older villages in Leicestershire since it has Anglo-Saxon origins (it is older than the much larger market town of Market Harborough, which lies nearby). Great Bowden was the centre of a large soke, which is known to have existed during the time of Edward the Confessor.

Parish 
The Great Bowden parish included Market Harborough and parts of St Mary in Arden. In 1613, St Mary in Arden was unified with Market Harborough Market Harborough was a separate parish by 1881.  The first mention of a parish church in Great Bowden was in 1220.  St Peter and St Paul, the current parish church, includes features from the 13th century, but it was considerably altered in the 15th century.   In 1886-87 the building was restored by Talbot Brown and Fisher, architects from Wellingborough.  The churchyard contain gravestones that date from the 17th century.

Education 
The National school was built adjoining the parish church in 1839, and opened on 2 December 1839, In 1930, it became solely a primary school and older children were educated in Market Harborough.   The National school building remained in use until the school relocated to Gunnsbrook Close in 1983. On 1 July 2012 the school became an academy.

Listed buildings 
There are 73 listed buildings and structures.

Site of scientific interest 
Great Bowden Borrowpit is a  site of special scientific interest.

References

External links
Great Bowden Historical Society
Great Bowden village website

Villages in Leicestershire
Civil parishes in Harborough District
Market Harborough